Kitchen Equipped is a show which aired on Food Network and HGTV.

The show, which shot three seasons was co-hosted by Canadian pastry and celeb chef Anna Olson (seasons two and three), carpenter Jay Purvis, and interior designer Stacy McLennan (season one).  Both Olson and Purvis explore building and renovating a kitchen.  Plus they explore gadgets, kitchen accessories, products, appliances, and a lot more. Stacey McLennan was the first winner of Designer Superstar Challenge.

Stacy McLennan was replaced after the first season with Chef Anna Olson.

Over the course of the first season, Purvis and McLennan showed the viewers how to design a kitchen.  Each episode would show a little more of the kitchen being done. The second and third seasons spent less time on the process and more on the finishes of the kitchen without showing the actual construction, just the various steps.

Current show status

Kitchen Equipped has aired its third season daily at 2 on HGTV. It also airs on Food Network and Fine Living.

Kitchen styles
The show has many kitchen styles which are:

Country Chic
Electric
Makeover Kitchen
Modern Valcucine
Suburban Makeover
Urban Traditional

Broadcasters
Past
Fine Living Canada - syndicated reruns
Food Network Canada - original broadcast
HGTV - original broadcast

Notes

External links
 Kitchen Equipped on HGTV.ca
Kitchen Equipped on-air schedule

Food Network (Canadian TV channel) original programming
2000s Canadian reality television series
HGTV (Canada) original programming